The Arts Council of Northern Ireland (Irish: Comhairle Ealaíon Thuaisceart Éireann, Ulster-Scots: Airts Cooncil o Norlin Airlan) is the lead development agency for the arts in Northern Ireland. It was founded in 1964, as a successor to the Committee for the Encouragement of Music and the Arts (CEMA).

As the main development agency for the arts it is responsible for the distribution of Exchequer and National Lottery Funding for the arts in Northern Ireland. The council is headquartered at Linen Hill House, 23 Linenhall Street, Lisburn. Organisationally it is a non-departmental public body of the Department for Communities.

Notable projects 
 Audiences NI
 Belfast Festival at Queens
 Cathedral Quarter Arts Festival
 Culture Northern Ireland
 Féile an Phobail

See also 
List of Government departments and agencies in Northern Ireland
Northern Ireland Screen
Arts Council (Ireland), with which it works closely

References

External links 
 Arts Council of Northern Ireland website

Arts councils of the United Kingdom
Culture of Northern Ireland
Arts organisations based in Northern Ireland
Non-Departmental Public Bodies of the Northern Ireland Executive